The Women's pursuit competition at the Biathlon World Championships 2021 was held on 14 February 2021.

Results
The race was started at 15:30.

References

Women's pursuit